The 1998 Saskatchewan Roughriders finished in 4th place in the West Division 1998 CFL season with a 5–13 record and missed the playoffs, failing to return to the Grey Cup game.

Offseason

CFL draft

Preseason

Regular season

Season standings

Season schedule

Roster

Awards and records

CFL All-Star Selections
Donald Narcisse, Wide Receiver
John Terry, Offensive Tackle

Western All-Star Selections
Donald Narcisse, Wide Receiver
John Terry, Offensive Tackle

Milestones

References

Saskatchewan Roughriders seasons
Saskatchewan Roughriders Season, 1998
Saskatchewan
Saskatchewan Roughriders